Preferably called dibenzosuberane (other less common names are Dibenzocycloheptene and dibenzocycloheptadiene) is a tricyclic chemical compound featuring two benzene rings bound to a cycloheptene group.  It is an occasional motif in synthetic organic chemistry. Various tricyclic antidepressants (TCAs) contain the dibenzocycloheptene moiety in their chemical structures, including amineptine, amitriptyline, amitriptylinoxide, butriptyline, demexiptiline, nortriptyline, noxiptiline, and protriptyline. Cyclobenzaprine, a skeletal muscle relaxant, also contains this functional group.

Numbering System

See also 

 Dibenzazepine
 Dibenzothiepin
 Dibenzoxepin
 Dibenzothiazepine

External links

References

Tricyclic antidepressants